Water polo events were contested at the 1977 Summer Universiade in Sofia, Bulgaria.

Final standings
  Romania
  Hungary
  Italy
  Yugoslavia
  Bulgaria
  United States
  Soviet Union
  Mexico
  Cuba
  West Germany
  Canada
  Brazil
  Japan

References
 Universiade water polo medalists on HickokSports (Broken link)
1977 Universiade Water polo schedule and results
 Water Polo Results - New York Times

1977 Summer Universiade
Universiade
1977
1977